Alkalihalobacillus lehensis is a Gram-positive, endospore-forming and alkalitolerant bacterium from the genus of Alkalihalobacillus which has been isolated from soil from Leh.

References

Bacillaceae
Bacteria described in 2007